Cape Breton North and Victoria (also known as North Cape Breton and Victoria  and Cape Breton North—Victoria) was a federal electoral district in the province of Nova Scotia, Canada, that was represented in the House of Commons of Canada from 1904 to 1968.

History
This riding was created in 1903 as "North Cape Breton and Victoria"' riding from Cape Breton and Victoria ridings.

It consisted initially of the county of Victoria, the northern part of the County of Cape Breton: the districts of Boisdale, Boularderie, East Bay (North), French Vale, George's River, Grand Narrows, and Little Bras d'Or, and the towns of North Sydney and Sydney Mines.

In 1924, its name was changed to "Cape Breton North—Victoria", and then to "Cape Breton North and Victoria" in 1933. It was redefined to consist of the county of Victoria, and that part of the county of Cape Breton contained in the municipal districts of Balls Creek and Edwardsville (No. 2), Big Pond (No. 13), Boisdale (No. 9), Boularderie (No. 10), East Bay North (No. 19), East Bay South (No. 8), Enon (No. 21), Frenchvale (No. 22), George's River (No. 23), Grand Narrows (No. 14) and Little Bras d'Or (No. 4), and including the towns of Sydney Mines and North Sydney.

In 1947, the riding was expanded to include the municipal districts of Hillside (No. 3), and South Forks (No. 18).

It was abolished in 1966 when it was redistributed into Cape Breton Highlands—Canso, Cape Breton—East Richmond and Cape Breton—The Sydneys ridings.

Members of Parliament

This riding elected the following Members of Parliament:

Election results

North Cape Breton and Victoria, 1904–1925

Cape Breton North—Victoria, 1925–1935

Cape Breton North and Victoria, 1935–1968

See also
 List of Canadian federal electoral districts
 Past Canadian electoral districts

External links
 Riding history for North Cape Breton and Victoria (1903–1924) from the Library of Parliament
 Riding history for Cape Breton North—Victoria (1924–1933) from the Library of Parliament
 Riding history for Cape Breton North and Victoria (1933–1966) from the Library of Parliament

Former federal electoral districts of Nova Scotia
Politics of the Cape Breton Regional Municipality
Victoria County, Nova Scotia